Big FM may refer to:

Big FM (Indian radio station)
Big FM (German radio station)
Big 106.2 (Big FM), a defunct Auckland, New Zealand radio station